Aisa Karay Ga Toh Maray Ga is a television drama/re-enactment show series on Pakistani news channel Express News. The show educates about what NOT to do to stay safe and alive. The show is directed by Shakeb Sultan.

Pakistani drama television series